Susan Elise Riechert (born October 20, 1945) is an American behavioral ecologist known for her research in evolutionary biology, evolutionary game theory and the behavior of spiders. She is also known for her "biology in a box" teaching materials, used by hundreds of thousands of elementary and secondary school students in Tennessee. 

Until her retirement in 2020, Riechert worked at the University of Tennessee as UTK Distinguished Service Professor and as UTK Chancellors Professor of Ecology & Evolutionary Biology. She was president of the American Arachnological Society for 1983–1985, and president of the Animal Behavior Society in 1997.

Early life and education
Riechert lost much of her hearing through scarlet fever as a child.  Her interest in spider behavior began through a field zoology class at the University of Wisconsin–Madison. After nearly drowning trying to catch fish for the class, she switched to a subject that was safer to catch, spiders. Her interest was further piqued after she observed a large population of spiders exhibiting territorial behaviors that only vertebrates were thought to be capable of at the time. Research that she conducted based on this interest would lead to her to publish her "seminal work","Games Spiders Play," in 1978.

Riechert earned a B.A. in 1967, an M.A. in 1970, and a Ph.D. in 1973, all at the University of Wisconsin–Madison.

Career and Research
Knox News described Riechert as "something of a pioneer - one of the first women to enter her field as an independent researcher."

Of particular note is the fact that several of her studies were focused on the effect that variations in a species had on the behavior of its members. In 1988, she and Peter Hammerstein conducted a study that led her to hypothesize that riparian populations of Agelenopsis aperta could not fully adapt to their new environs because of gene flow from non-riparian populations of the species that lived nearby. In 1989, Riechert co-authored a paper titled "Genetically-based variation between two spider populations in foraging behavior," in which she and fellow arachnologist Ann Hendrick discussed how genetic differences in the population of one species can have an impact on the way they search for food.

Members of the genus Agelenopsis (American grass spiders) featured prominently in Riechert's work, particularly the species Agelenopsis Aperta.  Riechert's focus as a behavioral arachnologist led her to examine both the genetic and non-genetic reasons behind these spiders' behaviors in various areas, such as feeding, maturation, and mating.  The genus was, in fact, the topic of "Games Spiders Play," a landmark contribution by Riechert to behavioral arachnology. Riechert demonstrated that the aforementioned spiders engaged in territorial disputes similar to those seen in much larger creatures. Most spiders are not social animals, so this behavior was unexpected at the time. Riechert's analysis would cement her place in the behavioral arachnology community.

Recognition
The Animal Behavior Society elected Riechert as a fellow in 1993. In 2008, Riechert was named a Fellow of the American Association for the Advancement of Science, "for distinguished contributions to the field of behavior and ecology". She won the Southeastern Conference Faculty Achievement Award for 2016. The Animal Behavior Society gave Riechert their 2018 Penny Bernstein Distinguished Teaching Award. A festschrift symposium, sponsored by the Animal Behavior Society, was held in her honor in 2020.

Notable associates
Jonathan Pruitt achieved a PhD with Riechert as his advisor and was able to attain prestigious positions in academia despite his youth thanks to his acclaimed publications.  However, the validity and truthfulness of his research data was called into question in 2020.  Since then, many of the papers Pruitt co-authored based on his data have been retracted, others called into question, and papers from other authors which cited Pruitt's compromised papers have had to have been corrected and updated.  In November 2021, University of Tennessee Knoxville removed Pruitt's dissertation from its library.  Riechert said she was "devastated" by the news, but added that if Pruitt had truly falsified data, he had to "pay the price".

Selected publications

References

External links
Home page

1945 births
Living people
University of Wisconsin–Madison alumni
University of Tennessee faculty
21st-century American biologists
American arachnologists
Fellows of the American Association for the Advancement of Science